Thone River, a perennial stream of the Hastings River catchment, is located in the Mid North Coast region of New South Wales, Australia.

Course and features
Thone River rises on the eastern slopes of Mount Gibraltar, within the Gibraltar Range, and flows generally north northeast for  before reaching its confluence with the Hastings River.

See also

 Rivers of New South Wales
 List of rivers of New South Wales (A–K)
 List of rivers of Australia

References

External links
 

Rivers of New South Wales
Mid North Coast
Port Macquarie-Hastings Council